Naglaa Ali Mahmoud (or ; born 4 July 1962) is the widow and cousin of the fifth President of Egypt, Mohamed Morsi and was First Lady from 2012 to 2013. Naglaa rejected the title of First Lady, preferring to be called "First Servant," the "president's wife," or "Umm Ahmed," a traditional name (kunya) which means mother of Ahmed, her oldest son.

Marriage
Naglaa married former president of Egypt Mohamed Morsi in 1979 when she was a seventeen-year-old student. Naglaa and Morsi have five children, including Abdullah and six grandchildren.

References

1962 births
Living people
20th-century Egyptian women
21st-century Egyptian women
First ladies of Egypt
People from Minya Governorate
Egyptian Sunni Muslims
Morsi family